Pia Maria Außerlechner (born 21 May 2003), who performs as Pia Maria, is an Austrian singer. She represented  at the Eurovision Song Contest 2022 alongside DJ Lumix.

Early life 
Pia Maria is from the Austrian region of Tyrol. She is a trained make-up artist and works at the Tyrolean State Theatre in Innsbruck. She has been writing her own songs since she was 16.

Career
Pia Maria represented  at the Eurovision Song Contest 2022 in Turin, Italy, performing the song "Halo" by DJ Lumix.

During the promotional pre-parties for Eurovision, Pia Maria received criticism for vocal issues during the live performances of "Halo". It was later confirmed that her vocal struggles were due to long COVID, as well as the vocalist's inexperience with in-ear monitors. The Austrian delegation hired a vocal coach to work with Pia Maria to prepare for the contest, and the backing track for "Halo" was transposed into a lower key for future pre-parties.

Following her Eurovision participation, Pia Maria announced the release of her first solo single, titled "I Know U Know", which was released in June.

On September 23, she announced a new song, "White Noise", which was released on October 7.

Discography

Singles

References 

2003 births
21st-century Austrian women singers
Living people
Eurovision Song Contest entrants of 2022
Eurovision Song Contest entrants for Austria
Austrian pop singers